In Hawaiian mythology,  is the brother of Kāmohoaliʻi,  and  (among others) by .

As a result,  is occasionally confused with the latter.

References 

Hawaiian mythology